Ahmed Sharif (born 31 August 1991) is a Maldivian film actor.

Career
Prior to acting, Sharif was more involved in the creative departments of the film where he served as a foley artist and a boom operator in Aishath Rishmy's romantic film Bos (2017). Impressed with the poster of Ehenas and thinking its a horror film, he contacted its casting director Rishmy who invited him to the audition of the series, where he was ultimately selected to play the role of Shinaz, a violent and short-tempered brother. Aishath Maahaa reviewing from Dho? praised the acting performance of the newcomers including Sharif. This was followed by Abdulla Muaz-directed segment Ruqyah from the anthology short film television series Hatharu Manzaru where he played the role of an exorcist. He then he collaborated with Ilyas Waheed for a four-part anthology web series Mazloom which was considered a "benchmark project" in the industry. Ahmed Rasheed from MuniAvas, reviewing its first chapter titled "Mazloom" praised the performance of Sharif for portraying the "innocent and caring" friend in its most realistic manner. He also starred in its second chapter titled "Zarrook" by playing the role of a father of a young child connecting with an imaginary friend.

In 2022, Sharif appeared in four web series, all of which received positive reviews from the critics. The year marks his second collaboration with Ilyas Waheed for his horror thriller anthology web series Biruveri Vaahaka as Rocky, a traumatized survivor of a sea incident. He then appeared in Ibrahim Wisan-directed Gudhan which follows the lives of seven strangers who hide inside a go-down in the neighborhood to flee an unknown police raid at a massage parlor. In the series he played the role of a Bangladeshi worker who forces his subordinate into sex slavery. This was followed by Moomin Fuad's romantic crime web series Netheemey starring alongside Nathasha Jaleel and Washiya Mohamed. In the series, he play the role of an irresponsible, spoilt kid who moves away from his family with his wife only to reunite with his ex-lover living in the opposite apartment.

Filmography

Television

References

External links
 

Living people
People from Malé
21st-century Maldivian actors
Maldivian film actors
1991 births